James Cary, or John Cary was a supposed English bishop. It is said that he was Bishop of Coventry and Lichfield (1419), and was translated to be Bishop of Exeter, but died before taking up the latter office. On the other hand, according to Fasti ecclesiae Anglicanae Vol. 1

References

Bishops of Exeter
Bishops of Coventry and Lichfield
15th-century deaths
Year of birth unknown